Anastasiya Dmitrieva (born 12 March 1987) is a Russian judoka.

She is the gold medallist of the 2017 Judo Grand Prix Antalya in the -78 kg category.

References

External links
 

1987 births
Living people
Russian female judoka
European Games competitors for Russia
Judoka at the 2015 European Games
21st-century Russian women